The Nocturnes are five piano pieces (planned as a set of seven, but unfinished)  by Erik Satie. They were written between August and November 1919. With the exception of the Premier Menuet (1920) they were his final works for solo piano, and are considered among his most significant achievements in the genre. The Nocturnes stand apart from Satie's piano music of the 1910s in their complete seriousness, lacking the zany titles, musical parody, and extramusical texts he typically featured in his scores of the time. In performance the set lasts about 13 minutes.

Background

Much had transpired in Satie's personal and professional lives in the two years since his previous keyboard piece, the Neoclassical spoof  Sonatine bureaucratique (1917). There was the fallout from the scandalous premiere of his ballet Parade (1917), including Satie's conviction of criminal libel for sending insulting postcards to a critic, from which he narrowly escaped imprisonment; his bitter estrangement from longtime friend Claude Debussy, and Debussy's subsequent death; and completion of the work he believed represented the best of himself, the "symphonic drama" Socrate (1918). Ridiculed by the French press and dogged by chronic poverty, Satie fell into a depressed state that reached its nadir in August 1918, when he wrote to Valentine Hugo, "I shit on Art, it has 'cut me up' too often." He then proceeded to break with the Nouveaux jeunes group of musicians he had recently founded, an act that set the stage for their eventual regrouping as Les Six. By the summer of 1919 his creative energies had revived, though his spirits remained hard-bitten and gloomy. "I have changed a lot during these last months", he mused to singer Paulette Darty. "I am becoming very serious...too serious, even." Such feelings may have steered him to the nocturne form itself - the province of Chopin, evocative of the night and usually quiet and introspective - and affected the way the project developed.

Composition

Satie's notebooks reveal he initially intended to present the Nocturnes with the whimsical literary humor the Parisian public had come to expect from him. The first piece had the working title Faux Nocturne and was accompanied by one of those little stories he enjoyed writing for the pianist's private amusement:

The night is silentMelancholy is all-pervasiveThe will-o'-the-wisp disturbs the peaceful landscapeWhat a bore! It's an old will-o'-the-wispTrust him to comeLet us resume our reverie, if you will 

But he soon abandoned the text and satirical nomenclature, choosing instead to let the Nocturnes stand as pure music. He also wrote them using conventional bar lines, a practice he had largely eschewed in piano music for nearly 30 years before returning to it – perhaps with a dash of irony – in the Sonatine bureaucratique.

On 24 August 1919 Satie informed Valentine Hugo: "I am coming to the end of my Third Nocturne. I am dedicating it to you. The three of them are not at all bad. The first serves as a prelude; the second is shorter and very tender – very nocturnal; the third, yours, is a more rapid and dramatic nocturne, a little longer than the first. Between the three of them they form a whole with which I am very pleased – though the first is the least good." This assessment was premature. Satie was not satisfied with the second Nocturne until the following month, and he continued to tinker with No. 3 until October - by which time he was developing ideas for additional pieces in the series. Nos. 4 and 5 are dated October and November 1919, respectively.

Publication and performance

Printing of the Nocturnes was split between two of Satie's regular publishers. Rouart, Lerolle & Cie issued Nos. 1–3 in late 1919; Nos. 4 and 5 were brought out by the firm E. Demets in 1920. Demets also advertised a sixth Nocturne without a price, indicating it was a work in progress, but the piece would not appear in the composer's lifetime.

Satie dedicated each of the completed five to a patron or proponent of his music:

1. Doux et calme (Soft and Quiet), for Marcelle Meyer
2. Simplement (Simply), for André Salomon
3. Un peu mouvementé (Somewhat Eventful), for Valentine Hugo
4.  = 92 (untitled), for the Countess Étienne de Beaumont
5.  = 60 (untitled), for Madame Georges Cocteau

The Nocturne No. 1 was premiered by Jane Mortier at the Salle Pleyel in Paris on 18 March 1920;  Nos. 1–3 were performed by Ricardo Viñes during an all-Satie concert at the Salle Érard on 7 June 1920. The fourth Nocturne was not heard until 4 January 1923, when it was played by Jean Wiener at the Théâtre des Champs-Élysées. There is no clear indication of the debut for No. 5; Marcelle Meyer may have performed it in 1921.

Reception

The Nocturnes caused no immediate stir, although at the Viñes performance Jean Cocteau and Les Six members Darius Milhaud and Louis Durey expressed their enthusiasm. Given Satie's reputation as a musical humorist, the audience may have been unsure if it was having its leg pulled. But they have long been prized by Satie aficionados. John Cage championed them in the United States after World War II, and they inspired choreographer Merce Cunningham's ballet Nocturnes (1956), in which the dances were created using chance procedure. Rollo H. Myers, Satie's first biographer in English (1948), ranked the Nocturnes with a handful of Satie compositions that are "outstanding and cannot be ignored by any student of contemporary music." He continued: "The Nocturnes are in a sense the natural corollary of Socrate, which preceded them by a year, and are conceived in the same gravely austere mood. The style is chastened, simplified, uncompromising in its rejection of any sensuous appeal, but the music is strangely impressive in its bleakness and almost inhuman detachment." The Nocturnes have never enjoyed the mainstream popularity of the Gymnopédies or other Satie piano works, and while they have been recorded by such artists as Aldo Ciccolini, Pascal Rogé and Jean-Yves Thibaudet, they remain, according to John Keillor's AllMusic review, "among the undiscovered masterpieces of the twentieth century."

Posthumous Nocturnes

Shortly before his death in 1925, Satie told Robert Caby that the manuscript of his sixth Nocturne was virtually complete and might be published someday. Six decades later, musicologist Robert Orledge examined Satie's notebooks from the period and discovered a single full draft of a piano piece, missing only two bars of the left-hand part. Orledge completed a performing version and it was published as Satie's Nocturne No. 6 in 1994. Speculative versions of a Nocturne No. 7, based on a 12-bar sketch in the notebooks, have been created by Orledge and others.

Recordings

Aldo Ciccolini recorded Nos. 1-3 for EMI in 1968, Nos. 4 and 5 in 1971, and 1–5 in 1988. Other notable recordings are by Frank Glazer (Vox, 1968), Jean-Joël Barbier (Universal Classics France, 1971, reissued 2002), Yūji Takahashi (Denon, 1976), Daniel Varsano (Columbia, 1979, reissued by Sony Classics 1992), France Clidat (Forlane, 1984), Klára Koermendi (Naxos, 1993), Bojan Gorišek (Audiophile Classics, 1994), Pascal Rogé (London, 1996), Olof Höjer (Swedish Society Discofil, 1996), Jean-Yves Thibaudet (Decca, 2002), and Cristina Ariagno (Brilliant Classics, 2006).

Notes and references

External links
 

Compositions by Erik Satie
20th-century classical music
Compositions for solo piano
1919 compositions